John Hanford (April 5, 1817 – April 1, 1863) was an American hatter, real estate agent, and politician from New York.

Life 
Hanford was born on April 5, 1817, in Norwalk Connecticut. He was the son of Charles Hanford, a commissioned officer during the War of 1812, and Ruth Seymour. He was a direct descendant of Thomas Hanford. Hanford started working as a hatter when he was 15, and worked in the trade until 1853, when he moved to the real estate business. He moved to Williamsburgh in 1838. He was elected trustee of Williamsburgh in 1845 and 1846. He also served as Deputy Sheriff of Kings County from 1847 to 1850. In 1855 he was elected to the New York State Assembly as a Democrat, representing the Kings County 1st District. He served in the Assembly in 1856, 1857, and 1858. In the 1860 congressional election, he unsuccessfully ran for Congress in New York's 5th congressional district.

In 1836, Hanford married Hannah Moore. They had no children.

Hanford died at home on April 1, 1863. He was buried in the Norwalk Union Cemetery.

References

External links 
 The Political Graveyard
 John Hanford at Find a Grave

1817 births
1863 deaths
Politicians from Norwalk, Connecticut
Politicians from Brooklyn
People from Williamsburg, Brooklyn
American real estate brokers
New York (state) local politicians
Democratic Party members of the New York State Assembly
19th-century American politicians
Burials in Connecticut
19th-century American businesspeople